Cercosaura argulus, the elegant eyed lizard or white-lipped prionodactylus is a species of lizard in the family Gymnophthalmidae. It is found in Colombia , Ecuador, Bolivia, French Guiana, Peru, and Brazil.

References

Cercosaura
Reptiles described in 1862
Taxa named by Wilhelm Peters